Sepaicutea is a genus of beetles in the family Cerambycidae, containing the following species:

 Sepaicutea costata Martins & Galileo, 2005
 Sepaicutea fisheri Lane, 1972
 Sepaicutea unicolor Martins, 1981

References

Xystrocerini